Czechowski (feminine: Czechowska; plural: Czechowscy) is a Polish surname. Notable people with the surname include:

 Heinz Czechowski (1935–2009), German poet and dramatist
 Lisa Czechowski (born 1979), American goalball player
 Michał Belina Czechowski (1818–1876), Polish Seventh-day Adventist missionary
 Zenon Czechowski (born 1946), Polish cyclist

See also
 
 Czechowski Śpiesz się powoli, Polish glider plane

Polish-language surnames
Ethnonymic surnames